Payena microphylla is a tree in the family Sapotaceae. The bark is black to reddish brown. Inflorescences bear up to 15 flowers. The specific epithet  is from the Greek meaning "small-leaved". Habitat is lowland mixed dipterocarp to montane forest, from sea level to  altitude. P. microphylla is endemic to Borneo.

References

microphylla
Endemic flora of Borneo
Trees of Borneo
Plants described in 1860